Akana (also known as Akna)  is a village of Nalbari district in Western Assam under 14 No Pub Banbhag Gram Panchayat.

See also
 Villages of Nalbari District

References

External links
 

Villages in Nalbari district